All Saints Church is located in Elizabeth Street, Preston, Lancashire, England.  It is an  evangelical Anglican parish church in the deanery of Preston, the archdeaconry of Lancaster, and the diocese of Blackburn. The church was built in 1846-1848 for the sum of £2000. It was built in the Classical style with six Ionic columns supporting a pedimented portico facade, and is now Grade II listed. It was one of the few churches in the country to be built by subscription and set up under Private Patronage. Nathan Buttery was inducted on 10 January to become the new vicar of All Saints, after their interregnum as their previous vicar, Daf Meirion-Jones, moved to Chessington Evangelical Church.

See also
Listed buildings in Preston, Lancashire

References

Church of England church buildings in Lancashire
Diocese of Blackburn
19th-century Church of England church buildings
Churches in Preston
Preston, All Saints